Individual eventing equestrian at the 2002 Asian Games was held in Busan Equestrian Grounds, Busan, South Korea from October 2 to October 4, 2002.

Schedule
All times are Korea Standard Time (UTC+09:00)

Results
Legend
EL — Eliminated

References

Results

External links
 2002 Asian Games official website

Individual eventing